Jay Clark may refer to:

 Jay Clark (gymnastics), American collegiate gymnastics coach
Jay Clark (sport shooter) (1880–1948), American sport shooter

See also
Jay Clarke (disambiguation)
Jason Clark (disambiguation)